Ursoaia may refer to several villages in Romania:

 Ursoaia, a village in Cotmeana Commune, Argeș County
 Ursoaia, a village in Negri Commune, Bacău County
 Ursoaia, a village in Viperești Commune, Buzău County
 Ursoaia, a village in Argetoaia Commune, Dolj County
 Ursoaia, a village in Negomir Commune, Gorj County
 Ursoaia, a village in Românești Commune, Iași County
 Ursoaia, a village in Papiu Ilarian Commune, Mureș County
 Ursoaia, a village in Icoana Commune, Olt County
 Ursoaia, a village in Ivănești Commune, Vaslui County
 Ursoaia, a village in Pesceana Commune, Vâlcea County
 Ursoaia, a village in Reghiu Commune, Vrancea County

and in Moldova:
 Ursoaia, Căușeni, a commune in Căușeni district
 Ursoaia, a village in Lebedenco Commune, Cahul district

and to:
Ursoaia, the Romanian name for Ursoya village, Yizhivtsi Commune, Storozhynets Raion, Ukraine

See also 
 Urs (disambiguation)
 Ursu (surname)
 Urși (disambiguation)